Koyra Madinabad Model Secondary School is a secondary schools of the southern part of Khulna district under Koyra Upazila of Khulna District in Bangladesh. The institute was established in the middle of the 19th century. The school was upgraded into a model through governmentalization and the education system was introduced from class sixth to twelfth. Out of which the technical curriculum has been included.

History
The school was established at Koyra Sadar on 1962. After a long time progress, the government was formalized as a Govt. and model school on 7th October 2018.

Co-education activities
 The scout team
 Debate competition
 Science Club
 Sports club
 The assembly

References

External links
Website

Schools in Khulna District
High schools in Bangladesh
Educational institutions of Koyra Upazila